Thomas Nelson Burford (August 29, 1935 – March 29, 2020) was an American pomologist, orchardist, and apple historian. He is considered one of the most influential figures in the revival of heritage apples and cider in the United States.

Early life and education
Burford was born on Tobacco Row Mountain in Amherst County, Virginia. His Burford ancestors were early settlers of Amherst and Nelson Counties, first arriving in 1715. He studied philosophy at the University of Virginia.

Career
He and his brother ran Burford Brothers, a company which ran several businesses including a forestry business, a sawmill, and a construction company that specialized in passive solar construction.
 
When he closed his business in 1994, he gave his collection of more than 200 heirloom apple varieties to Vintage Virginia Apples in North Garden, Virginia.

Burford was a consultant on the care of old orchards and the design of new ones. He lectured for many years on the history of apple cultivation in the United States and the origins of the apple. He held yearly workshops on apple grafting, including at Monticello.

Notably Burford confirmed the identity of the Harrison apple when it was rediscovered in the latter 20th century. Previously this variety was believed to be lost. Historically the Harrison had the highest reputation among cider apples. Subsequently Tom made Harrison grafts available to orchards in the United States and exported grafts to France.

Awards and honors
He won the 2014 American Horticultural Society Book Award for his book Apples of North America.

He won the 2015 "Founding Cville" award from the Tom Tom Founders Festival.

Books
Apples: A Catalog of International Varieties (T. Burford, 2004)
Apples of North America: Exceptional Varieties for Growers, Gardeners and Cooks (Timber Press, 2013)

References

Pomologists
2020 deaths
1935 births
People from Amherst County, Virginia
American horticulturists
University of Virginia alumni